Mount Leval is located on the border of Alberta and British Columbia on the Continental Divide. It was named in 1918 after Gaston de Leval, a Belgian lawyer who unsuccessfully defended Edith Cavell, a British nurse. Cavell was caught helping Allied soldiers escape in German-occupied Belgium during World War I. She was tried for treason under German military law and executed by firing squad in 1915.

See also
 List of peaks on the British Columbia–Alberta border

References

Two-thousanders of Alberta
Two-thousanders of British Columbia
Canadian Rockies